MEE (2-methoxy-4,5-diethoxyamphetamine) is a lesser-known psychedelic drug of the amphetamine class. It is a diethoxy-methoxy analog of TMA-2. MEE was first synthesized by Alexander Shulgin. In his book PiHKAL, both the dosage and duration are unknown. MEE produces few to no effects. Very little data exists about the pharmacological properties, metabolism, and toxicity of MEE.

See also 
 Phenethylamine
 Psychedelics, dissociatives and deliriants

References

Substituted amphetamines